Barwick Valley is an ice-free valley north of Apocalypse Peaks, extending from Webb Glacier to Victoria Valley in Victoria Land, Antarctica. It was named by the Victoria University of Wellington Antarctic Expedition (VUWAE) (1958–59) for R.E. Barwick, summer biologist with the New Zealand party of the Commonwealth Trans-Antarctic Expedition (1956–58) who worked in this area in 1957–58 and as a member of the VUWAE, 1958–59.

Antarctic Specially Protected Area
An area of 480 km2, comprising parts of both Barwick Valley and the adjacent Balham Valley, is protected under the Antarctic Treaty System as Antarctic Specially Protected Area (ASPA) No.123 because it is one of the least disturbed or contaminated of the McMurdo Dry Valleys.  It is consequently important as a reference base for measuring changes in the similar polar desert ecosystems of the other Dry Valleys where scientific investigations are conducted.

References

 

Valleys of Victoria Land
McMurdo Dry Valleys
Antarctic Specially Protected Areas